Youssef En-Nesyri (pronounced ; born 1 June 1997) is a Moroccan professional footballer who plays as a striker for La Liga club Sevilla and the Morocco national team.

En-Nesyri has spent his entire senior footballing career in Spain, representing Málaga, Leganés and Sevilla. He has made over 150 La Liga appearances and scored over 40 goals.

He made his international debut in 2016 aged 18, after previously being capped by the nation's youth teams at under-20 level. He was chosen in Morocco's squads for the FIFA World Cup in 2018 and 2022, helping the team to fourth place at the latter. He was also picked for the Africa Cup of Nations in 2017, 2019 and 2021.

Club career

Málaga
After starting his youth career at Maghreb de Fès and Mohammed VI Football Academy, En-Nesyri joined Málaga CF for a fee of €125,000 in 2015. Initially assigned to the Juvenil squad, he made his senior debut for the reserves on 16 April 2016, scoring the last goal in a 3–1 Tercera División away win against Guadix CF. He netted back-to-back goals in the following three matches against CD Huétor Tájar, River Melilla CF and FC Vilafranca and went on to become an integral player for the reserve side which narrowly missed promotion to the Segunda División B.
On 8 July 2016, En-Nesyri was included in first team manager Juande Ramos' pre-season squad, and scored a double in a 4–0 friendly win against Algeciras CF eight days later.

On 23 August 2016, after scoring six goals during the pre-season, En-Nesyri agreed to a contract extension until 2020. Three days later he made his professional – and La Liga – debut, coming on as a late substitute for Keko in a 2–2 away draw against RCD Espanyol.

En-Nesyri scored his first professional goal on 21 September 2016, netting the winner in a 2–1 home victory against SD Eibar, after coming on as a substitute for Charles. He contributed with four goals in 25 league appearances during the 2017–18 campaign, as his side suffered relegation.

Leganés
On 17 August 2018, following Malaga's relegation from the La Liga, En-Nesyri signed a five-year contract with CD Leganés in the main category. He scored his first goals in his ninth game, to earn a 2–2 home draw with nearby Rayo Vallecano in the first leg of the last 32 of the Copa del Rey on 30 October, and on 23 November he netted his first league goal, the only one of a victory also at the Estadio Municipal de Butarque against a Deportivo Alavés team that was challenging for top spot.

In late January to February 2019, En-Nesyri scored six goals in three games as Leganés avoided defeat: a brace in a 2–2 draw with Eibar, the late winner at Rayo and then all three goals against Real Betis; this last result made him the first Pepinero to net a hat-trick in La Liga.

Sevilla
On 16 January 2020, Sevilla signed En-Nesyri from Leganés for a reported €20 million, on a contract lasting to June 2025; the Andalusians had recently sold their strikers Mu'nas Dabbur and Javier Hernández. He debuted two days later in a 2–1 loss at Real Madrid, as a 65th-minute substitute for Munir El Haddadi, and on his first start on 9 February he opened the scoring on a trip to RC Celta de Vigo with the same result.

En-Nesyri made his debut in European competitions on 20 February 2020, in the UEFA Europa League last 32 first leg away to CFR Cluj in Romania. He scored the late equaliser in a 1–1 draw, that put his team through on the away goals rule. On 6 August 2020, he scored a goal in a 2–0 win over Roma in the round of 16. Sevilla went on to win the 2020 UEFA Europa League.

On 4 November 2020, he scored a brace in a 3–2 win over FC Krasnodar in the 2020–21 UEFA Champions League, to be his first goals in the competition. On 8 December, he scored another brace in 3–1 away win over Rennes.

In January 2021, En-Nesyri scored hat-tricks in home wins over Real Sociedad (3–2) and Cádiz CF (3–0). On 9 March 2021, he scored a brace in a 2–2 away draw against Borussia Dortmund in the second leg of the Champions League round of 16; however, Sevilla were eliminated as they lost 4–5 on aggregate. On 14 March, he scored the winning goal in a 1–0 win over Real Betis in the Seville derby. On 4 April 2021, En-Nesyri marked his hundredth match played for the team against Barcelona. On 22 April 2021, En-Nesyri became the highest scoring Moroccan in La Liga history with his goal in a 1–0 victory against Levante.

International career
After representing Morocco at under-20 level, En-Nesyri was called up to the full squad by manager Hervé Renard on 22 August 2016, for friendlies against Albania and São Tomé and Príncipe. He made his debut against the former nine days later, starting in a 0–0 draw at the Loro Boriçi Stadium in Shkodër.

En-Nesyri was called up for the 2017 Africa Cup of Nations in Gabon, and scored in the second group game in a 3–1 win over Togo. He was a late addition to the squad for the 2018 FIFA World Cup in Russia, at the expense of defender Badr Banoun. In the last group game against Spain at the Kaliningrad Stadium, he gave the team a late lead in a 2–2 draw.

At the 2019 Africa Cup of Nations in Egypt, En-Nesyri scored the only goal of a win over the Ivory Coast to send the Atlas Lions into the last 16. There, he equalised against Benin as the game went to a penalty shootout, in which Saturnin Allagbé saved from him to knock the Moroccans out.

En-Nesyri was also called up for the 2021 Africa Cup of Nations in Cameroon. In his first game back after a long injury, he came on in the 65th minute for Ayoub El Kaabi and missed a penalty in a 2–0 win over Comoros. He scored the equaliser in a 2–1 win over Malawi in the last 16.

On 10 November 2022, he was named in Morocco's 23-man squad for the 2022 FIFA World Cup in Qatar. On 10 December, in their quarter-final match against Portugal, En-Nesyri jumped  to score the lone goal to put Morocco through to the semi-finals, the first African nation to do so.

Career statistics

Club

International

Scores and results list Morocco's goal tally first, score column indicates score after each En-Nesyri goal.

Honours
Sevilla
UEFA Europa League: 2019–20
 UEFA Super Cup runner-up: 2020 

Individual
Leganés Player of the Season: 2018–19
La Liga Player of the Month: January 2021
France Football CAF Men Team of The Year: 2021
Castore Player of the Month: February 2023

Orders
Order of the Throne: 2022

References

External links

Profile at the Sevilla FC website

1997 births
Living people
People from Fez, Morocco
Moroccan footballers
Association football forwards
La Liga players
Tercera División players
Mohammed VI Football Academy players
Atlético Malagueño players
Málaga CF players
CD Leganés players
Sevilla FC players
Morocco under-20 international footballers
Morocco international footballers
Moroccan expatriate footballers
Moroccan expatriate sportspeople in Spain
Expatriate footballers in Spain
2017 Africa Cup of Nations players
2018 FIFA World Cup players
2019 Africa Cup of Nations players
2021 Africa Cup of Nations players
2022 FIFA World Cup players
UEFA Europa League winning players